The Victory ship was a class of cargo ship produced in large numbers by North American shipyards during World War II to replace losses caused by German submarines. They were a more modern design compared to the earlier Liberty ship, were slightly larger and had more powerful steam turbine engines, giving higher speed to allow participation in high-speed convoys and make them more difficult targets for German U-boats.  A total of 531 Victory ships were built in between 1944 and 1946.

VC2 design 

One of the first acts of the United States War Shipping Administration upon its formation in February 1942 was to commission the design of what came to be known as the Victory class. Initially designated EC2-S-AP1, where EC2 = Emergency Cargo, type 2 (Load Waterline Length between ), S = steam propulsion with AP1 = one aft propeller (EC2-S-C1 had been the designation of the Liberty ship design), it was changed to VC2-S-AP1 before the name "Victory Ship" was officially adopted on 28 April 1943. The ships were built under the Emergency Shipbuilding program.

The design was an enhancement of the Liberty ship, which had been successfully produced in extraordinary numbers. Displacement was up just under 1,000 tons, to 15,200. With a raised forecastle and a more sophisticated hull shape to help achieve the higher speed, they had a quite different appearance from Liberty ships.

To make them less vulnerable to U-boat attacks, Victory ships made ,  faster than the Libertys, and had longer range.  The extra speed was achieved through more modern, efficient engines.  Rather than the Libertys'  triple expansion steam engines, Victory ships were designed to use either Lentz type reciprocating steam engines (one ship only, oil fired), Diesel engines (one ship) or steam turbines (the rest, all oil fired) (variously putting out between ). Another improvement was electrically powered auxiliary equipment, rather than steam-driven machinery.

Like Liberty ships, the hull was welded rather than riveted.

The VC2-S-AP2, VC2-S-AP3, and VC2-M-AP4 were armed with a /38 caliber stern gun for use against submarines and surface ships, and a bow-mounted /50 caliber gun and eight 20 mm cannon for use against aircraft.  These were manned by United States Navy Armed Guard personnel. The VC2-S-AP5 s were armed with the 5-inch stern gun, one quad 40 mm Bofors cannon, four dual 40 mm Bofors cannon, and ten single 20 mm cannon.  The Haskells were operated and crewed exclusively by U.S. Navy personnel.

The Victory ship was noted for good proportion of cubic between holds for a cargo ship of its day. A Victory ship's cargo hold one, two and five hatches are a single rigged with a capacity of 70,400, 76,700, and 69,500 bale cubic feet respectively. Victory ship's hold three and four hatches are double rigged with a capacity of 136,100 and 100,300 bale cubic feet respectively.
Victory ships have built-in mast, booms and derrick cranes and can load and unload their own cargo without dock side cranes or gantry if needed.

Construction 
The first vessel was  launched at Oregon Shipbuilding Corporation on 12 January 1944 and completed on 28 February 1944, making her maiden voyage a month later. American vessels frequently had a name incorporating the word "Victory". After United Victory, the next 34 vessels were named after allied countries, the following 218 after American cities, the next 150 after educational institutions and the remainder given miscellaneous names.

Although initial deliveries were slow—only 15 had been delivered by May 1944—by the end of the war 531 had been constructed. The Commission cancelled orders for a further 132 vessels, although three were completed in 1946 for the Alcoa Steamship Company, making a total built in the United States of 534, made up of:

Of the wartime construction, 414 were of the standard cargo variant and 117 were attack transports. Because the Atlantic battle had been won by the time the first of the Victory ships appeared none were sunk by U-boats. Three were sunk by Japanese kamikaze attack in April 1945.

Many Victory ships were converted to troopships to bring US soldiers home at the end of World War II as part of Operation Magic Carpet. A total of 97 Victory ships were converted to carry up to 1,600 soldiers. To convert the ships the cargo hold were converted to bunk beds and hammocks stacked three high for hot bunking. Mess halls and exercise places were also added.

Some 184 Victory ships served in the Korean War and a 100 Victory ships served in the Vietnam War. Many were sold and became commercial cargo ships and a few commercial passenger ships. Some were laid up in the United States Navy reserve fleets and then scrapped or reused. Many saw postwar conversion and various uses for years afterward. The single VC2-M-AP4 Diesel-powered Emory Victory operated in Alaskan waters for the Bureau of Indian Affairs as North Star III. Dutton aided in locating the lost hydrogen bomb following the 1966 Palomares B-52 crash.

Starting in 1959, several were removed from the reserve fleet and refitted for the National Aeronautics and Space Administration. Another was the former Haiti Victory, which recovered the first man-made object to return from orbit, the nose cone of Discoverer 13, on 11 August 1960.   was converted in 1969–1970 to the range instrumentation ship  for downrange tracking of ballistic missile tests.

Four Victory ships became fleet ballistic missile cargo ships transporting torpedoes, Poseidon missiles, packaged petroleum, and spare parts to deployed submarine tenders:
 , built as 
 , built as 
 , built as 
 , built as 

In the 1960s two Victory ships were reactivated and converted to technical research ships by the U.S. Navy with the hull type AGTR.  became  and SS Simmons Victory became . Liberty was attacked and severely damaged by Israeli forces in June 1967 and subsequently decommissioned and struck from the Naval Register. Belmont was decommissioned and stricken in 1970. Baton Rouge Victory was sunk in the Mekong delta by a Viet Cong mine in August 1966 and temporarily blocked the channel to Saigon.

Cost 
According to the War Production Board minutes in 1943, the Victory Ship had a relative cost of $238 per deadweight ton (10,500 deadweight tonnage)  for $2,522,800, .

Shipyards 
Most Victory ships were constructed in six West Coast and one Baltimore emergency shipyards that were set up in World War II to build Liberty, Victory, and other ships.  The Victory ship was designed to be able to be assembled by the smallest capacity crane at these shipyards.

Ships in class

 United States Merchant Marine, 414 SS Victory cargo ships. World War II, some used in the Korean War and Vietnam War.
 97 Victory ships temporarily converted to World War II troopship.
 , 117 World War II US Navy troop ships – amphibious assault ships.
 Boulder Victory-class cargo ship, 20 World War II US Navy cargo ships.

  was converted and used as a temporary minesweeper in 1945 and 1946.
 Seagoing cowboys ships, 1946 to 1947 temporary conversion of 46 Merchant Marine Victory ships to transport relief livestock.
 Greenville Victory-class cargo ship, 1950s nine Victory ships under US Navy ownership for Korean War.
 , 1950 conversion of two ships: USNS Lt. James E. Robinson and 
 Denebola-class stores ship three Victory ships that came under US Navy ownership in 1952: ,  and 
 Phoenix-class auxiliary ship, 1960 three US Navy Forward Floating Depots: ,  and 
 Watertown-class missile range instrumentation ship, 1960 conversion of three ships: ,  and 
 Longview-class missile range instrumentation ship, 1960 conversion of three ships: ,  and 
 Kingsport telemetry ship, 1961 conversion of one ship, USNS Kingsport.
 Belmont-class research ship, 1963 conversion of two ships:  and 
 Norwalk class ballistic missile submarine tenders, four converted in 1963: T-AK-279, T-AK-280, T-AK-281, T-AK-282
 Range Sentinel telemetry ship, 1971 conversion of one ship: USS Sherburne

Survivors

Three are preserved as museum ships:
  (Tampa, Florida)
  (Los Angeles, California)
  (Richmond, California)

See also
 Empire ships
 Liberty ship
 List of Victory ships
 Port Chicago disaster
 T2 tanker
 Type C1 ship
 Type C2 ship
 Type C3 ship
 U.S. Merchant Marine Academy
 Murmansk Run
 World War II United States Merchant Navy
Away All Boats about Victory Attack transport

Notes

References
 SS American Victory Web site
 SS Lane Victory Web site
 U-Boat net
 United States National Park Service document on historical significance of SS Red Oak Victory
 Lane, Frederic, Ships for Victory: A History of Shipbuilding under the U.S. Maritime Commission in World War II. Johns Hopkins University Press, 2001. 
 Sawyer L. A., and W. H. Mitchell, Victory Ships and Tankers; the history of the "Victory" type cargo ships and of the tankers built in the United States of America during World War II. Cambridge, Maryland: Cornell Maritime Press, 1974
 Heal, S. C., A Great Fleet of Ships: The Canadian Forts and Parks. Vanwell, 1993 
 All About Victory Ships at TAGS Ship Web Site

External links

 Liberty Ships and Victory Ships, America's Lifeline in War – a lesson on Liberty ships and Victory ships from the National Park Service's Teaching with Historic Places
 "Victory Ship Makes 15 knots, Outstrips Liberty" Popular Mechanics, December 1943

 
World War II auxiliary ships of the United States
Ship types